Malik Ahmad Khan Bhachar is a Pakistani politician who had been a member of the Provincial Assembly of the Punjab from October 2018 till January 2023. Previously he was member of the Punjab Assembly from May 2013 to May 2018.

Early life and education
He was born on 19 April 1968 in Wan Bhachran, Mianwali District, Punjab, Pakistan.

He graduated in 1989 from University of the Punjab and has a degree of Bachelor of Arts.

Political career
He was elected to the Provincial Assembly of the Punjab as a candidate of Pakistan Tehreek-e-Insaf (PTI) from Constituency PP-45 (Mianwali-III) in 2013 Pakistani general election. He received 59,746 votes and defeated Ali Haider Noor Khan Niazi.

In 2018, he was allocated PTI ticket to contest the 2018 Pakistani general election from Constituency PP-87 (Mianwali-III), however election was postponed in the constituency following the death of a contesting candidate.

He was re-elected to the Provincial Assembly of the Punjab as a candidate of PTI from Constituency PP-87 (Mianwali-III) on 12 October 2018. He was elected unopposed after rest of the contesting candidates withdrew.

References

Living people
Punjabi people
Punjab MPAs 2013–2018
1968 births
Pakistan Tehreek-e-Insaf MPAs (Punjab)
Punjab MPAs 2018–2023